The Bible is a canonical collection of texts considered sacred in Judaism or Christianity. Different religious groups include different books within their canons, in different orders, and sometimes divide or combine books, or incorporate additional material into canonical books. Christian Bibles range from the sixty-six books of the Protestant canon to the eighty-one books of the Ethiopian Orthodox Church canon.

Hebrew Bible

Prophets

Samuel
Enoch

Kings

David
Solomon

Priests
 Aaron
 Eleazar
 Eli
 Phinehas

Tribes of Israel
According to the Book of Genesis, the Israelites were descendants of the sons of Jacob, who was renamed Israel after wrestling with an angel. His twelve male children become the ancestors of the Twelve Tribes of Israel.

 Asher
 Benjamin
 Dan
 Gad
 Issachar
 Joseph, which was split into two tribes descended from his sons:
 Tribe of Ephraim
 Tribe of Manasseh
 Judah
 Levi
 Naphtali
 Reuben
 Simeon
 Zebulun

Deuterocanon

Maccabees
Eleazar Avaran
John Gaddi
John Hyrcanus
Jonathan Apphus
Judas Maccabeus
Mattathias
Simon Thassi

Greek rulers
Alexander the Great
Antiochus III the Great
Antiochus IV Epiphanes
Philip II of Macedon

Persian rulers
Astyages
Darius III

Others
Baruch
Tobit
Judith
Susanna

New Testament

Jesus and his relatives
 Jesus Christ
 Mary, mother of Jesus
 Joseph
 Brothers of Jesus
 James (often identified with James, son of Alphaeus)
 Joseph (Joses)
 Judas (Jude) (often identified with Thaddeus)
 Simon
 Mary of Clopas
 Cleopas (often identified with Alphaeus and Clopas)

Apostles of Jesus

The Thirteen:
 Peter (a.k.a. Simon or Cephas)
 Andrew (Simon Peter's brother)
 James, son of Zebedee
 John, son of Zebedee
 Philip
 Bartholomew  also known as "Nathanael"
 Thomas also known as "Doubting Thomas"
 Matthew also known as "Levi"
 James, son of Alphaeus
 Judas, son of James (a.k.a. Thaddeus or Lebbaeus)
 Simon the Zealot
 Judas Iscariot (the traitor)
 Matthias

Others:
 Paul
 Barnabas
 Mary Magdalene (the one who discovered Jesus’ empty tomb)

Priests
 Caiaphas, high priest
 Annas, first high priest of Roman Judea
 Zechariah, father of John the Baptist

Prophets
 Agabus
 Anna
 Simeon
 John the Baptist

Other believers

 Apollos
 Aquila
 Dionysius the Areopagite
 Epaphras, fellow prisoner of Paul, fellow worker
 John Mark (often identified with Mark)
 Joseph of Arimathea
 Lazarus
 Luke
 Mark
 Martha
 Mary Magdalene
 Mary, sister of Martha
 Nicodemus
 Onesimus
 Philemon
 Priscilla
 Silas
 Sopater
 Stephen, first martyr
 Timothy
 Titus

Secular rulers

 Agrippa I, called "King Herod" or "Herod" in Acts 12
 Felix governor of Judea who was present at the trial of Paul, and his wife Drusilla in Acts 24:24
 Herod Agrippa II, king over several territories, before whom Paul made his defense in Acts 26.
 Herod Antipas, called "Herod the Tetrarch" or "Herod" in the Gospels and in Acts 4:27
 Herodias
 Herod the Great
 Philip the Tetrarch
 Pontius Pilate
 Salome, the daughter of Herodias
 Quirinius

Roman Emperors
 Augustus
 Tiberius
 Nero

See also

 List of biblical names
 List of burial places of biblical figures
 List of Jewish biblical figures
 List of minor biblical figures, A–K
 List of minor biblical figures, L–Z
 List of minor New Testament figures

References

major